Jason Wild (born 10 February 1976) is a former Australian rules footballer who played with the Collingwood Football Club in the Australian Football League (AFL).

Selected by the Collingwood Magpies at number 39 in the 1993 National Draft from New South Wales country club Collingullie-Ashmont, Wild made his AFL debut in 1995 on ANZAC Day and would play 12 games in his debut season. Wild was criticised over his career for his poor skills, yet his work ethic and determination was at a high level and was a go-to man for Tony Shaw as a run-with type player. Wild played 70 games for the club between 1995 and 1999 before being delisted.

External links 

1976 births
Living people
Australian rules footballers from New South Wales
Collingwood Football Club players